The Last Drive-in with Joe Bob Briggs is an American variety streaming television series created by Joe Bob Briggs, Austin Jennings, and Matt Manjourides for Shudder.

Briggs was known for hosting Joe Bob's Drive-in Theater and MonsterVision, and so Shudder decided to have him host a standalone marathon of horror movies of his choosing. The positive reception exceeded their expectations, resulting in a continued partnership. The series has four seasons and thirteen specials, with more on the way.

The show follows Briggs as he hosts two or more films alongside Darcy the Mail Girl (Diana Prince), with cameos by production designer Yuki Nakamura, music supervisor John Brennan, and the occasional guest. The hosted segments include Briggs' "Drive-in Totals," as well as fun facts, rants, singing, comedy, interviews, awards, and performances.

Production 

Over 17 years after the cancellation of MonsterVision, Joe Bob Briggs tweeted that Shudder had shown interest in reviving the series. An official announcement was made on June 25, 2018, that Briggs would be returning in a 24-hour marathon for the Shudder TV live feed. On July 13, Shudder aired The Last Drive-in with Joe Bob Briggs ("July 2018 Marathon"), featuring Tourist Trap, Sleepaway Camp, Rabid (1977), The Prowler, Sorority Babes in the Slimeball Bowl-O-Rama, Daughters of Darkness, Blood Feast, Basket Case, Re-Animator, Demons (1985), The Legend of Boggy Creek, Hellraiser, and Pieces. The movies contained several interruptions for Briggs's "Drive-in Totals," insider stories, and rants. These segments also included Darcy the Mail Girl (Diana Prince), who showed up in movie-themed outfits to banter with Briggs and brought messages from fans, as well as live-tweeted with viewers. The show's guests were Felissa Rose from Sleepaway Camp and Lyle Blackburn for The Legend of Boggy Creek.

Following the success of the "July 2018 Marathon," on September 5, 2018, Shudder announced the decision to greenlight two more specials for 2018 and a regular series beginning in 2019. For Thanksgiving, Briggs hosted "Joe Bob's Dinners of Death" on November 22, 2018, cementing the shows format. Featured movies included The Texas Chain Saw Massacre (1974), The Hills Have Eyes (1977), Dead or Alive (1999), and Blood Rage, with special guest Michael Berryman, who played Pluto in the second film, and a phone call with "mangled dick expert" Felissa Rose. Next, Briggs hosted "A Very Joe Bob Christmas" on December 21, 2018, which was centered around Phantasm, Phantasm III: Lord of the Dead, Phantasm IV: Oblivion, and Phantasm: Ravager. Guests included franchise hero Reggie Bannister and Phantasm: Ravager special effects makeup coordinator Gigi Bannister. On February 28, 2019, Shudder announced that The Last Drive-in with Joe Bob Briggs series would formally premiere on March 29, 2019, consisting of nine weekly double features live every Friday night. The first episode premiered with C.H.U.D. and Castle Freak (1995), alongside guests Barbara Crampton, who played Susan Reilly in Castle Freak, and Felissa Rose, the returning "mangled dick expert." On April 16, 2019, Darcy began holding weekly contests to see who could guess both films being hosted.

Ahead of the Season 1 finale, on May 22, 2019, Shudder announced their decision to renew the series for a second season. On October 7, it was announced that Briggs would return with a special titled "Joe Bob's Halloween Hootenanny" on October 25. Briggs hosted Halloween (1978), Halloween 4: The Return of Michael Myers, and Halloween 5: The Revenge of Michael Myers, with a phone call from Tom Atkins. On the day of the Halloween special, Briggs announced that on December 13, he would be hosting his next Shudder special, "Joe Bob's Red Christmas." Briggs hosted the movies Black Christmas (1974), Jack Frost (1997), and Silent Night, Deadly Night Part 2. Darcy and Briggs honored Dinosaur Dracula with the first "Silver Bolo Award."

On March 24, 2020, Briggs announced that the second season of The Last Drive-in with Joe Bob Briggs would premiere on April 24. From this point onward, seasons would consist of ten weekly double features every Friday. The premiere of Season 2 aired Chopping Mall, with guest Kelli Maroney who played Alison Parks, and Bloodsucking Freaks, with co-host Chris Jericho. Later in the second season, Darcy reinstated the MonsterVision weekly caption contest for this series. "Week 8" saw the world premiere of Hogzilla, starring Briggs, and featured Darcy listing the "Drive-in Totals."

On July 14, 2020, Shudder announced that the series would return for a third season in 2021, along with a "Summer Sleepover" double feature on August 14. Briggs and Darcy hosted Slumber Party Massacre II and Victor Crowley in their pajamas. Felissa Rose, Adam Green, Kane Hodder, Brian Quinn, and Tiffany Shepis joined them as guests for the second film. On August 20, Briggs confirmed that the next special would be held on October 23. The team hosted "Joe Bob's Halloween Hideaway," where they showed Haunt and Hack-O-Lantern from a new cabin set. On November 10, Briggs announced that there would be another special premiering on December 11, titled "Joe Bob Saves Christmas." During this special, Briggs and Darcy auctioned items for The Trevor Project, The National Women's Law Center, The Peaceful Valley Donkey Rescue, and the Organization for Autism Research on eBay, while hosting Dial Code Santa Claus and Christmas Evil.

On January 19, 2021, Briggs announced that he would be hosting a Valentine's Day special with Darcy titled "Joe Bob Put a Spell on You" on February 12. Briggs and Darcy hosted Tammy and the T-Rex followed by The Love Witch, featuring an interview with director Anna Biller. On February 23, Briggs tweeted that the third season of The Last Drive-in with Joe Bob Briggs would premiere on April 16, and would be hosted at the cabin set. Eli Roth served as the co-host for both films during the Season 3 premiere, which featured Mother's Day (1980) and The House by the Cemetery. On April 19, Shudder premiered "Just Joe Bob" on their streaming service, which features a permanent archive of Briggs' segments and commentary without the films.

On June 24, 2021, Shudder announced that The Last Drive-in with Joe Bob Briggs had been renewed for a fourth season, along with additional holiday specials. On September 1, Briggs tweeted that he would be hosting a Halloween special with Darcy titled "Joe Bob's Halloween Hoedown" on October 8. On September 8, Darcy revealed that the Silver Bolo Award was discontinued by Shudder going forward due to controversy following Ghastly Grinning turning it down during the previous season. On October 8, Briggs and Darcy hosted Angel (1984) and Terror Train for this year's October special, alongside guests David Gordon Green and Jason Blum. On October 22, Briggs and Darcy revealed that they would be hosting "The Last Drive-In: The Walking Dead" on October 29, where they would watch the first two episodes of The Walking Dead Season 1 with guests Greg Nicotero and Carey Jones. On November 17, Briggs tweeted that his team would be hosting a Christmas special titled "Joe Bob Ruins Christmas" on December 17. That night, Briggs and Darcy auctioned items for First Book, the National Coalition Against Domestic Violence, the National Greyhound Foundation, and the Appalachia Service Project, while hosting Ice Cream Man and 'Gator Bait.

On January 19, 2022, Shudder announced that Briggs and Darcy would be returning to celebrate Valentine's Day with a special titled "Joe Bob's Heartbreak Trailer Park" premiering on February 11. During the special, Briggs and Darcy hosted Black Roses (1988) alongside The Boulet Brothers, and Frakenhooker with guests Frank Henenlotter and James Lorinz. Then, on March 16, Shudder reported that the fourth season of The Last Drive-in with Joe Bob Briggs would premiere on April 29, celebrating their 100th movie on the platform. This season premiere featured Briggs and Darcy hosting their 100th film, Night of the Living Dead (1968), with guest host Svengoolie, as well as the first movie that Briggs ever reviewed on his column, Antropophagus, with guest mail girl Honey Michelle Gregory. Later, on June 30, Shudder green-lit a fifth season of the series along with additional holiday themed specials. This was followed by an announcement on August 12 that the next holiday special, "Joe Bob’s Haunted Halloween Hangout," would be held on October 21. That night, Briggs and Darcy were joined by Cassandra Peterson for Elvira's Haunted Hills, as well as Jill Schoelen for Popcorn (1991). On November 17, it was revealed the Briggs and Darcy would be returning for a Christmas special titled "Joe Bob's Ghoultide Get-Together" on December 16.

Episodes

Season 1 (2019)

Season 2 (2020)

Season 3 (2021)

Season 4 (2022)

Specials

References

External links
 Official website

2018 American television series debuts
2010s American horror television series
2010s American variety television series
2010s American television series
2020s American horror television series
2020s American variety television series
Horror movie television series
American horror fiction television series
Horror fiction web series
Midnight movie television series
English-language television shows
Shudder (streaming service) original programming
Television shows filmed in Texas
Television shows filmed in New Jersey